Kang Cing Wie was a 12th-century Chinese woman who married the Balinese king Jayapangus. Her father was a merchant.

She is remembered as the Goddess of Prosperity in traditional Balinese culture.

References

12th-century Chinese women
12th-century Chinese people
Chinese emigrants to Indonesia
12th-century Indonesian women